The 1981 Jacksonville State Gamecocks football team represented Jacksonville State University as a member of the Gulf South Conference (GSC) during the 1981 NCAA Division II football season. Led by fifth-year head coach Jim Fuller, the Gamecocks compiled an overall record of 8–3 with a mark of 6–0 in conference play, and finished as GSC champion. In the playoffs, Jacksonville State were defeated by Southwest Texas State in the first round.

Schedule

References

Jacksonville State
Jacksonville State Gamecocks football seasons
Gulf South Conference football champion seasons
Jacksonville State Gamecocks football